The 1979–80 Baylor Bears men's basketball team represented Baylor University during the 1979–80 men's college basketball season.

Schedule

|-
!colspan=9 style=| Southwest tournament

References 

Baylor Bears men's basketball seasons
Baylor
1979 in sports in Texas
1980 in sports in Texas